Come And Get It: The Rare Pearls is a compilation album of previously unreleased tracks by American family group The Jackson 5, which was released digitally on August 28, 2012 and physically on September 18, 2012.

Background
This compilation contains unreleased songs, recorded by the group during their tenure on the Motown Records label. Some of them are cover versions (Randy Newman's "Mama Told Me Not to Come", Traffic's "Feelin' Alright" and labelmates The Supremes' "You Can't Hurry Love"), and some of the tracks are alternate versions of already released songs (a longer version of "That's How Love Is" and the demo version of "Mama's Pearl" which was known as "Guess Who's Making Whoopie With Your Girlfriend").

Marketing
In November 2009, Motown Records released I Want You Back! Unreleased Masters, a selection of unreleased tracks by the Jackson 5. It coincided with the 40th anniversary of their debut single on the label ("I Want You Back" b/w "Who's Lovin' You"), and closely followed the release of the documentary–concert film Michael Jackson's This Is It. The physical version of this compilation was released on September 18, 2012, the same day as Michael Jackson's Bad 25.

Track listing

Cover versions
 "I Got a Sure Thing" was originally recorded by William Bell for his 1969 album Bound to Happen.
 "Mama Told Me Not to Come" was originally recorded by Eric Burdon & The Animals for their 1967 album Eric Is Here, and more famously known as a 1970 single by Three Dog Night.
 "Since I Lost My Baby" was originally a 1965 single by The Temptations.
 "Keep an Eye" and "I'm Your Sunny One (He's My Sunny Boy)" were originally recorded by The Supremes for their 1968 album Love Child.
 "Movin'" was originally recorded by Jackie DeShannon for her 1969 album Put a Little Love in Your Heart.
 "Feelin' Alright" was originally a 1968 single by Traffic.
 "You Can't Hurry Love" was originally a 1966 single by The Supremes.
 "Up on the Roof" was originally a 1962 single by The Drifters.
 "Let's Go Back to Day One" was originally recorded by Eddie Kendricks for his 1971 album All by Myself.
 "Label Me Love" was originally a 1972 single by Different Shades Of Brown, whose background vocals were used on this cover recording.

References

2012 compilation albums
Motown compilation albums
The Jackson 5 compilation albums
Hip-O Records compilation albums